Lake Thunderbird is a reservoir located in Norman, Oklahoma. The lake was constructed between 1962 and 1965 for the purpose of providing municipal water to the nearby communities of Del City, Midwest City and Norman. In addition to being a source for drinking water, Lake Thunderbird's secondary uses include numerous recreational activities.

The lake is named for the Native American legend of the Thunderbird, a supernatural bird of power and strength. Many locals commonly refer to the lake as "Lake Dirtybird" due to the very murky lake water.

Norman Dam
The Little River valley was the subject of several Army United States Army Corps of Engineers studies in 1936 and 1947 for flood control. In 1953 the issue of water supply was raised among a council of local governments consisting of Norman, Midwest City, Del City, Moore and Tinker Air Force Base, and it was forecast that by the 1970s and 1980s the cities would be requiring all available water to meet municipal demand. A feasibility study in 1954 led to a plan report in May 1961, and construction began on Norman Dam in 1962.

Oklahoma State Highway 9 was re-routed in 1963 from present-day Alameda Street to its current location, south of the lake. The dam and lake were completed in 1965 by the United States Bureau of Reclamation. The earthen dam has a height of 144 feet and impounds 171,400 acre-feet of water. The Bureau owns the dam, which is operated by the local Central Oklahoma Master Conservancy District.

Recreation
Lake Thunderbird is a venue for boating, fishing, swimming, and hiking.

Boating and Sailing:
The lake has two marinas and a boathouse that are operated and maintained by the Lake Thunderbird Boathouse volunteer organization. The Boathouse Organization in cooperation with the Lake Thunderbird Education Foundation make possible several events throughout the year, including sailing lessons, sailing camps for children, an annual fishing derby for developmentally disabled children, sanctioned sailboat races, and fun regattas.

Swimming:
There are a number of specified swimming beaches at Lake Thunderbird, including Zoom Beach and Little Sandy. Little Sandy is protected by a buoy-line about 50 yards from the shore that prevents boat access, Zoom Beach has a designated swimming area with buoys indicating 'no boats' allowed. Regular weekly organized open water swimming events are organized by the Triathlon Club of Oklahoma City in partnership with the Lake Thunderbird Boathouse from the end of April through to the end of September each year. Some 'winter swimmers' even swim throughout the colder months.
Long distance swim: On April 6, 2021 local swimmer Piers Hale swam the length of the lake, covering a distance of 16,800 yards in 6 hours and 10 minutes. The water temperature was 59.5 degrees, the wind was 17-20 mph, gusts from 25-30 mph.

Fishing:
Fish species stocked at the lake include large-mouth bass, crappie, sunfish, channel catfish, white bass, and saugeye.

Lake Thunderbird State Park

The 6,000 acre (24 km²) lake is the centerpiece of Lake Thunderbird State Park. In addition to water activities the park offers hunting, horse rental and boarding, equestrian trails, hiking, mountain biking, nature trails, a nature center, and an archery range. The park has 447 primitive campsites and unfurnished one-room lake huts as well as RV provisions. The park is near two casinos. It had its own restaurant, the Clear Bay Cafe, until during the late spring rains in May and June 2015, Lake Thunderbird flooded and the restaurant was so badly damaged that it closed permanently. On May 10, 2010 the Little River Marina was struck by a tornado and was closed until it was rebuilt in 2012.

Eagle watching
Lake Thunderbird falls within the bald eagle winter migration corridor. Bald eagles are present at the lake roughly from December through February. Guided eagle tours are provided by the Crow's Secret Nature Center.

Lake monster controversy
In recent years the lake has become the subject of national attention due to allegations of a lake monster, believed by some to be a freshwater octopus. Due to an increase in reports of drownings in recent years, tales of the "Oklahoma Octopus" have increased, gaining national attention from media outlets such as Animal Planet's Lost Tapes. To date the octopus remains a myth since no freshwater species of octopus are known to exist, and because of the relatively young age of the human-made lake with no connecting inlets.

Reservoir details
The water temperature of the lake ranges from about  during the summer months to under  during the winter months. Surface water temperature is usually about  during spring and fall months.

The rate at which sediment was accumulating in the lake is  a year. The capacity of the reservoir, the maximum depth, and the average depth had all decreased since 1965. The following table gives original statistics for the reservoir from 1965.

Pop culture references
Toby Keith wrote a 2010 song "Kissin' in the Rain" about Lake Thunderbird off his Bullets in the Gun album.

References

External links
 Oklahoma State Parks & Outdoor Guide

Thunderbird
Norman, Oklahoma
Protected areas of Cleveland County, Oklahoma
Dams in Oklahoma
Dams completed in 1965
United States Bureau of Reclamation dams
Bodies of water of Cleveland County, Oklahoma